Susuman is a town in Susumansky District of Magadan Oblast, Russia.

Susuman may also refer to:
Susuman Urban Settlement, a municipal formation which the town of Susuman in Susumansky District of Magadan Oblast, Russia is incorporated as
Susuman Airport, an airport in Magadan Oblast, Russia
Susuman River, a river in Magadan Oblast, Russia